Wik Paach (Wikapatja), also known as Abodja, is an extinct Australian language of Queensland. It remains unclassified. The form of the name comes from one of the Wik languages, where wik means "language", but Paach is not itself a member of that family.

References

Paman languages
Extinct languages of Queensland
Unclassified languages of Australia